La Longue Rocque is the tallest megalithic standing stone in the Channel Islands. The menhir stands in a field next to Les Paysans road in Guernsey. The granite block is 3.5m tall and extends a further metre below the ground.

It is believed that it was erected between 3000-1500BC.

Description
Excavation in 1894 found the menhir to be trigged with one stone and embedded in gravel. It is estimated to weigh five tons. The menhir is located at 49° 26′ 40.6″ N / 02° 38′ 07.4″ W.

On the north facing edge of the menhir is an area worn smooth by touching or ‘rubbing’ over the millennia. This may be due to ‘ritual’ rubbing on the stone, or, more likely, the stone being used as a ‘scratching’ post for livestock over the 6500 years it's been here. Place names surrounding these fields suggest other menhirs that have disappeared due to farming, building and superstition.

Folklore

Youngsters in Guernsey were told stories of the ‘Grande Pierre’ as La Longue Rocque is sometimes called. The block was said to be a giant's cricket bat. A giant round rock (the ball) can be found near the back of the Imperial Hotel at Rocquaine.

References

Buildings and structures in Guernsey
Megalithic monuments in Europe